Dreaming Creek is a stream in Madison County, Kentucky, in the United States.

According to tradition, Dreaming Creek was named on account of a dream of Daniel Boone.

See also
List of rivers of Kentucky

References

Rivers of Madison County, Kentucky
Rivers of Kentucky